Oleksandr Lepekho (born 25 October 1971) is a Ukrainian retired footballer.

Career
Oleksandr Lepekho started his career in 1992 with Desna Chernihiv where he played 39 matches. In 1993 he played 13 matches with Cheksyl Chernihiv another club in the city of Chernihiv. In 1994 he moved back to Desna Chernihiv where he played 12 matches and then he played 12 matches again with Cheksyl Chernihiv. In 1995 he moved to Voskhod Slavutich where he played 30 matches and scored 3 goals in the main time the club changed its name to Nerafa Slavutych. In 1997 he moved to Torpedo Mogilev a club in Belarus where he played 46 matches and scored 1 goal. In 1999 he moved back to Desna Chernihiv in Chernihiv where he played 54 matches in 2002 he moved to Nizhyn playing 20 matches and scored 1 goal.

References

External links 
 Oleksandr Lepekho at footballfacts.ru

1971 births
Living people
Footballers from Chernihiv
FC Desna Chernihiv players
FC Cheksyl Chernihiv players
FC Slavutych players
FC Torpedo Mogilev players
Ukrainian footballers
Ukrainian Premier League players
Ukrainian First League players
Ukrainian Second League players
Ukrainian expatriate footballers
Ukrainian expatriate sportspeople in Belarus
Expatriate footballers in Belarus
Association football defenders